Gretchen Mol (born November 8, 1972) is an American actress and former model. She is known for her role as Gillian Darmody in the HBO series Boardwalk Empire (2010–2014). She also appeared in the films Rounders (1998), Celebrity (1998), The Thirteenth Floor (1999), The Notorious Bettie Page (2005), in which she played the title character, 3:10 to Yuma (2007), and Manchester by the Sea (2016).

Early life
Mol was born on November 8, 1972, in Deep River, Connecticut, where her mother, Janet (née Morgan), is an artist and teacher, and her father is a teacher at RHAM High School. She went to high school with Broadway actor Peter Lockyer, with whom she performed in school musicals and plays. Her brother, Jim Mol, is a director and editor in the film industry. Mol attended The American Musical and Dramatic Academy and graduated from the William Esper Studio. She took a job for a while as an usher at Angelika Film Center in New York. She had followed her brother there when he was in NYU film school.

Stage

Mol's acting career began in summer stock theatre in Vermont where she played a variety of roles, including Godspell and 110 in the Shade. She played Jenny in Neil LaBute's The Shape of Things on stage in both London and New York in 2001, in a role she reprised in the film version, released in 2003. The New York Times critic Ben Brantley, in his review of the play (which he disliked), wrote, "[Mol] gives by far the most persuasive performance as the unworldly Jenny, and you wind up feeling for her disproportionately, only because she seems to be entirely there, in the present tense". In 2004, Mol spent a year singing and dancing as Roxie Hart in the Broadway production of Chicago. In 2014–2015, Mol played the role of Emily in the Broadway debut of Ayad Akhtar's Pulitzer-Prize-winning play, Disgraced.

Film

While major roles have been sporadic, Mol has been in more than 30 feature films. She made her film debut in Spike Lee's 1996 film, Girl 6. She said, "I was auditioning for Guiding Light and I was happy I got a Spike Lee movie, which was a tiny part, but all of a sudden I had Spike Lee on my resume. I didn't audition for day player anymore".

After Girl 6, New York filmmaker Abel Ferrara took notice and cast her in two movies, The Funeral (1996) and New Rose Hotel (1998). She had a small role in Donnie Brasco (1997), but by now, she was being typecast as "the girlfriend", which she attempted to change by taking a role opposite Jude Law in Music from Another Room (1998), a romantic comedy. The film went virtually unnoticed by critics and audiences.

In 1998, she appeared in several notable films, including Rounders, starring Matt Damon and Woody Allen's Celebrity opposite Leonardo DiCaprio. In 1998, she also came to prominence when she was featured on the cover of Vanity Fair, dubbed the "It Girl of the Nineties" by the magazine.

For her second film with Woody Allen, 1999's Sweet and Lowdown, she played a minor role which the Greenwich Village Gazette called "notable". She played the female lead role in the 1999 film The Thirteenth Floor. She played the victim of a con artist in the 2003 film Heavy Put-Away, based on the Terry Southern story. In 2006, she shared the lead in a romantic comedy, Puccini for Beginners, in which her character has a lesbian affair.

Mol worked with Mary Harron for two years as the director struggled to finance The Notorious Bettie Page: "I kind of felt like I lived with it for a while; certainly not as long as Mary Harron did but I got a good chance to really feel like I knew something about Bettie so by the time the role was mine and I was on set, I was pretty confident. I felt like I really worked for it."

The next year, 2007, was one of her busiest, with four films in production or in release, including a remake of 3:10 to Yuma starring Russell Crowe, and An American Affair, in which her character, Catherine Caswell, has an affair with John F. Kennedy. When released in February 2009, the film was harshly criticized by New York Times critic Stephen Holden, though he said that Mol's part was "quite well acted".

In April 2008, she began filming Tenure in Philadelphia, working opposite Luke Wilson and Andrew Daly. Though it had received some good reviews after being screened at several film festivals, it was released direct-to-video in February 2010.

Television

Mol's first television work was in a Coca-Cola commercial. Mol had a small role of Maggie Tilton in the 1996 miniseries Dead Man's Walk, based on the Larry McMurtry novel. She also was in a few episodes of Spin City. She was among the three lead actresses in David E. Kelley's 2002 series girls club, though it ended after its second episode due to underwhelming ratings.

She appeared in two TV remakes of classic films: Picnic (2000), in the role of Madge Owens, and The Magnificent Ambersons as Lucy Morgan (2002). She made a Hallmark Hall of Fame television movie in January 2007, starring in The Valley of Light, a story set in post-World War II based on a novel by Terry Kay. It was her second Hallmark production. She had a minor role in Calm at Sunset in 1996.

She played Norah in The Memory Keeper's Daughter which aired on The Lifetime Channel in the U.S. in April 2008.

She played NYPD Officer Annie Norris in the ABC series Life on Mars, the U.S. remake of the British show of the same name. It started airing in the U.S. on October 9, 2008 and ran 17 episodes, concluding on April 1, 2009.

Mol had a recurring role on HBO's Boardwalk Empire as Gillian Darmody, a showgirl at the Beaux Arts and mother and incestuous lover to gangster Jimmy Darmody (played by Michael Pitt). The actress shared two SAG Awards for Outstanding Performance by an Ensemble in a Drama Series with the cast in 2010 and 2011.

In February 2018, she played attorney Sam Henessy in the Netflix series Seven Seconds. On April 18, 2018, Netflix confirmed the show would not have a second season, deeming it a limited series.

Personal life
Interviewed by the Associated Press in Baltimore in December 2006, Mol commented about how she maintained her confidence as an actress: "It is an ongoing struggle. Confidence is something that sometimes you have and sometimes you don't. And the older you get, hopefully, the more you have some tools to at least fake it".

She married film director Tod Williams on June 1, 2004. Their first child, a son, was born in September 2007. In February 2011, Mol gave birth to their second child, a daughter. Since becoming a mother, Mol has only taken jobs close to her home in New York City. "I told my agent I didn't want to work in L.A., even if it was the greatest job in the world. I didn't want to compromise."

Mol serves as the national spokesperson in the United States for the PMD Foundation, which funds research and awareness of Pelizaeus–Merzbacher disease, a neurological disorder which affects children worldwide. Mol became involved with PMD after one of her cousins died from amyotrophic lateral sclerosis (familiarly known as "Lou Gehrig's Disease").

Filmography

Film

Television

References

External links

 
 Gretchen Mol shares her favorite NY places at ontheinside.info
 Gretchen Mol gets notorious as pinup legend Bettie Page at Popentertainment.com, April 17, 2006. (accessed May 31, 2010)
 interview at SuicideGirls.com

1972 births
20th-century American actresses
21st-century American actresses
Actresses from Connecticut
American film actresses
American Musical and Dramatic Academy alumni
American television actresses
Living people
People from Deep River, Connecticut
Theatre World Award winners
William Esper Studio alumni